Roachford is the debut album by British band Roachford, released in 1988 on Columbia Records. It includes the single "Cuddly Toy", which reached number four in the UK Singles Chart and number 25 on the US Billboard Hot 100 in 1989, becoming the band's biggest hit on both charts.

Track listing
All tracks written and arranged by Andrew Roachford.

Personnel
Andrew Roachford – lead vocals, keyboards, synth bass, backing vocals
Michael Brown, Hawi Gondwe – guitar, backing vocals
Paul Bruce, Derrick Taylor – bass
Chris Taylor – drums, percussion, backing vocals
Mark Feltham – harmonica
Fayney – effects, percussion
Delina Raime, Mike Vernon, Shola Phillips, George Chandler, Jimmy Chambers, Jimmy Helms, Marianne Stephens – backing vocals

Charts and certifications

Weekly charts

Certifications

References

External links
Roachford at Discogs

1988 debut albums
Albums produced by Mike Vernon (record producer)
Roachford albums
Rock albums by British artists
Columbia Records albums